Terence John Quinn CBE FRS is a British physicist, and emeritus director of the International Bureau of Weights and Measures, where he was director from 1988 until 2003.

Life
He received a B.Sc. in physics from the University of Southampton in 1959, and D.Phil. from the University of Oxford in 1963.

He was at the National Physical Laboratory until 1977, working with his colleague John Martin.
He was editor of Notes and Records of the Royal Society from 2004 until 2007.

He is on the CODATA Task Group, of the International Council for Science (ICSU).

He won the Richard Glazebrook Medal and Prize in 2003.

References

British physicists
Fellows of the Royal Society
Commanders of the Order of the British Empire
Living people
Year of birth missing (living people)
Recipients of the Great Cross of the National Order of Scientific Merit (Brazil)